Bo on the Go!  (stylized Bo on the GO!) is a Canadian children's television series created by Jeff Rosen and produced by Halifax Film in association with CBC Television. It emphasizes the importance of movement for children through a plot element called “animoves” (animations showing specific body movements young viewers must learn in order to solve adventures highlighted in each program's storyline; the name is a combination of ‘animal’ and ‘move’ as these movements are represented by animals, such as a galloping horse). The series was broadcast in Canada on CBC Television in the Kids' CBC programming block.

Bo on the Go! is currently broadcast on 18 broadcasters around the world, in over 13 languages, such as Spanish, French (retitled 1, 2, 3, Bo!), Italian, Greek, Arabic, Thai, Finnish, Hebrew, Portuguese (on Disney Junior under the title Bo, em Ação!), Turkish, Hungarian, Chinese and Gaelic. Bo on the Go! aired from September 3, 2007 to March 1, 2011. 55 episodes were produced.

Overview
Bo lives in a castle with Dezadore the dragon. He is younger than Bo, and is really curious and often gets into trouble as he is not as physically adept as Bo. Bo's mentor on the show is Wizard. When she encounters challenges, he gives her advice and knowledge of how to achieve the quest at hand.

Voice cast 
Catherine O'Connor as Bo
Andrew Sabiston as Dezadore
Jim Folwer as Wizard

Episodes

Season 1
Bo's Bluebird

Bo and the Scribbler
Bo and the Red Rosy
Bo and the Knotty Noodler

Season 2
Bo and the Glimmer Critter
Bo and the Creaky Crink
Bo and the Stuffy Sniffler
Bo and the Gobsobber
Bo and the Blockhead
Bo and the Melody Maestro
Bo and the Ding-A-Ling
Bo and the Fun Fair
Bo and the Picture Snitcher
Bo and the Eager Beaver
Bo and the Unwrapping Chappy
Bo and the Berrygrabber

Bo and the Wrong Side Uppy
Bo and the Polka Dot Snatcher

Season 3
Bo and the Loony Groomy
Bo and Mr. Ha-choo!
Bo and the Copy Critter
Bo and the Cozy Critter
Bo and the Balance Beasty
Bo and the Ick 'em Stick 'em
Bo and the Shake Maker
Bo and the Jeweled Mermaid
Bo and the Toy Buster
Bo and the Pull Apart-er
Bo and the Power-On Pixie
Bo and the Float Fairy
Bo and the Worrywart
Bo and the Costume Collector
Bo and the Teeny-Tiny

References

External links
 DHX Media's website

 Bo on the GO! YouTube

Canadian children's animated adventure television series
Canadian children's animated fantasy television series
CBC Television original programming
2007 Canadian television series debuts
2011 Canadian television series endings
Television series by DHX Media
2000s Canadian animated television series
2010s Canadian animated television series
Canadian computer-animated television series
Animated television series about children
Canadian preschool education television series
Animated preschool education television series
2000s preschool education television series
2010s preschool education television series
English-language television shows